WRCR (1700 AM) is a commercial radio station, licensed to Haverstraw, New York and serves Rockland County. WRCR broadcasts an adult contemporary music format with weekday news-talk shows. The station is owned by Alexander Broadcasting, Inc. Studios and offices are at 144 Ramapo Road in Garnerville, New York, and the transmitter site is at South Mountain Park in the town of Haverstraw, New York.

Programming
WRCR is the only radio station providing English language news and information specifically for Rockland County, as WRKL 910 AM in nearby Pomona, New York, switched to an all-Polish format on March 19, 1999.  After numerous technical difficulties, during which WRKL went off the air, WRKL returned to the air on March 1, 2022,, simulcasting the Spanish Christian programming of WNYG, Patchogue, New York. 

The station airs a local morning talk show co-hosted by Steve Possell. Possell has been heard on Rockland's airwaves (previously on WRKL-New City, New York) for nearly 50 years. It also broadcasts New York Boulders minor league baseball games.

History
WRCR's roots date to September 1, 1965, when the station signed on as WRRC, daytime-only, on 1300 kHz in Spring Valley, New York, with studios at Broadcast House on Route 59. The station used its original transmitter site in Nanuet, New York for 52 years, although a new tower was erected in 2015 for the operation at 1700 AM.

Move to 1700 AM
On March 17, 1997, the Federal Communications Commission (FCC) announced that eighty-eight stations had been given permission to move to newly available "Expanded Band" transmitting frequencies, ranging from 1610 to 1700 kHz. One of the authorizations was for WZNN in Rochester, New Hampshire to move from 930 to 1700 kHz. However, the 1700 AM operation was never built, and its Construction Permit was cancelled on December 22, 2000.

The abandonment of the Rochester, New Hampshire assignment left 1700 AM unoccupied by any stations in the northeastern United States. Normally the FCC did not allow any stations not included in its May 17, 1997 authorization list to apply for operation on an expanded band frequency. However, in 2006 the commission granted a request allowing WRCR to move from 1300 to 1700 kHz, stating that a "waiver is warranted to permit the licensing of a station that could provide full-time local emergency radio service to Rockland County residents who would be at great risk in the event of a radiological emergency at the Indian Point facility".

On July 13, 2015, WRCR moved from 1300 to 1700 kHz, increasing its power from 500 to 10,000 watts by day and adding night service at 1,000 watts. The higher power allowed the station to be heard over a wider area of the lower Hudson Valley and Northern New Jersey. Along with the facility upgrade, the station's City of License was changed from Spring Valley to Ramapo. Both are communities in Rockland County.

WRCR operated with the call letters WLIR, from late 1987 until 2000. WLIR had been the call letters for a famous and successful FM station operating in Garden City, New York. When the operator of that station lost their FCC license, they brought their WLIR callsign to this Rockland County station. In 2000, WLIR changed its callsign to WRCR.

Station goes silent/dispute with transmitter landowner
On August 7, 2017, WRCR management announced via the station's website that the station would be off-the-air on its 1700 kHz frequency until further notice due to an emergency relocation of their transmitter and tower equipment. On August 29, 2017 Alexander Broadcasting Inc. filed a "Notice of Suspension of Operations" with the FCC seeking consent to go silent on the 1700 kHz frequency. It stated that the owner of the land where WRCR's transmitter and tower was located had opted not to renew the station's lease, and that the landlord had the power and other vital utilities to the property shut off without notifying the station. In the notice on their website, WRCR management stated that they would continue to broadcast via the live stream on their website and also via the TuneIn app and Amazon Echo devices.

The station resumed radio broadcasting on April 27, 2019, from a new transmitter site in South Mountain Park in the town of Haverstraw, New York. The station was authorized to move its community of license to Haverstraw effective October 21, 2021.

References

External links

FCC History Cards for WRCR (covering 1960-1981 as WRRC / WKQW / WGRC)

RCR
Radio stations established in 1965